FK Karbinci is a football club based in the village of Karbinci near Štip, Republic of Macedonia. They currently play in the Macedonian Third League.

References

External links
Club info at MacedonianFootball 
Football Federation of Macedonia 

Karbinci
Karbinci Municipality